Lagos Baptist Academy is a secondary school located in Obanikoro, Lagos, Nigeria. The school was established in 1855 by the American Baptist Missionaries. The school is regarded as a sister school to Reagan Memorial Baptist Girls' Secondary School, Yaba, Lagos and Baptist Girls' Academy, Obanikoro, Lagos.

History
The school's history can be traced to the establishment of First Baptist Church Mission in Lagos by an African-American missionary. The mission was given a parcel of land by Oba Dosunmu and structures were soon built on the land. Educational activities started after the completion of the buildings and the expansion of missionary activities led to a gradual growth in the school's population. By 1886, the school had about 129 boys and 95 girls in the primary section and about 14 boys and 3 girls in the secondary section. Prior to 1926, American pastors of the Baptist Mission acted as principals for the school but in January 1926, Eyo Ita and E.E. Esua joined the staff and in August of the year, Ita became the headmaster.

The initial venue of the school was on Broad Street, Lagos and later moved to a new location along the Ikorodu Road, Lagos. The Primary School section remained at that location but was renamed.

Rather than close the Primary School on Broad Street, Lagos; only the secondary school moved to Ikorodu Road in Obanikoro. The Primary school remained at Broad Street and was renamed W.J David(William Joshua David) Memorial Baptist Primary School after one of the American baptist missionaries that started the baptist Mission in Nigeria. The Primary school remained at the Broad Street location until the late nineteen eighties when its building was pulled down in anticipation of expanding the First Baptist Church (adjacent to the school) to include a high-rise business building. All the students at W.J David were transferred to other Baptist primary schools in the area.

School motto
Deo duce which means God is my leader.

School slogan
Up Baptacads

Baptacads Mobilization Song
We are Baptist Academy boys and
We're proud of our dear Alma Mater
Where sweet fellowship we all enjoy
Where the spirit of Christ is taught
Where our captain, God, lead us along
We"ll be true to our Alma Mater always.

Up school Up Baptacads

List of principals
Some of the principals of the school include

 Prof. S.M Harden.  1855
 Miss Lucile Reagan.  1924 – 1937
 Dr. A. Scott Patterson.  1937 – 1940
 Rev. B.T Griffin 1941 – 1945
 Rev. John Mills 1946 – 1951
 Rev. G.Lane 1951 – 1953
 Rev. Dr. J.A. Adegbite(first Nigerian principal of the school) 1954 – 1975
 Mr. Abayomi Ladipo 1976 – 1977(Old boy)
 Mr. Micheal O. Alake 1977 – 1979
 Rev. V.S Adenugba. 1979 – 1981
 Rev. S.O.B. Oyawoye 1981 – 1982
 Mr. Olakunle 1982 – 1983
 Mr. Aiyelokun 1983 – 1991
 Mr. C.O. Oduleye 1992 – 1994
 Mr. A.C. Adesanya. 1994 – 1999
 Mrs. F.O. Ojo. 1999 – 2003
 Mr. H.O. Alamu 2003 – 2009
 Rev. Mrs. B.A Ladoba 2009 – 2018
 Dcn. Gbenga Abodunrin 2018 until date

Notable alumni
Mobolaji Bank Anthony
K.O. Mbadiwe
Sir Chief Kessington Adebutu Founder Premier Lotto (Baba Ijebu)
Olu. Oguntokun former sports administrator, former Chairman of Lagos State Boxing Association, former Sole Administrator of Lagos State Sports Council]].
Ekundayo Opaleye Former military governor of Ondo State.
Molade Okoya-Thomas
Olabisi Onabanjo first civilian Governor of Ogun State
Babatunde Kwaku Adadevoh
Horatio Agedah Nigerian lawyer and journalist
Ahmed Yerima notable playwright 
Wahab Dosunmu Politician and Senator 
Ifagbemi Awamaridi Spiritualist, Private Detective, Activist.
Michael Opeyemi Bamidele Nigerian lawyer, human rights activist, member of 7th National Assembly
John Momoh CEO of Channels TV
Funsho Adeolu award-winning actor
Abisogun Leigh former vice chancellor of Lagos State University
Samuel Akintola former teacher at Baptist Academy
Femi Kuti musician
Ademola Adebise Managing Director/CEO Wema bank Plc
Bade Aluko Chairman Great Nigeria Insurance Plc
Mike Ozekhome human right activist and Senior Advocate of Nigeria 
Tayo Fatunla Cartoonist with BBC

See also

 Education in Nigeria
 List of schools in Lagos

References

External links

19th-century establishments in Lagos
1855 establishments in the Kingdom of Lagos
Baptist schools in Nigeria
Educational institutions established in 1855
Secondary schools in Lagos State
Schools in Lagos